Mecodema parataiko is a species of beetle, the most widespread of the Northland species, being found in forests from Whangarei north to Herekino.

References

parataiko
Beetles of New Zealand
Beetles described in 2011